Erica Marie Dambach (born November 16, 1975) is an American college soccer coach. She is the head coach of Penn State Nittany Lions women's soccer. She led Penn State to the 2015 National Championship. She is a two-time NSCAA Coach of the Year, winning the award in 2012 and 2015.

Coaching career
She was the head coach at Dartmouth from 2000 to 2002, resigning following the 2002 season in order to pursue educational opportunities. After serving as an assistant coach at Lehigh, she was hired as an assistant coach at Florida State in January 2005. She was hired as head coach at Harvard prior to the 2006 season. In February 2007, she then resigned at Harvard in order to take the Penn State head coaching position. She was named the NSCAA Coach of the Year in 2012 and 2015.

She led Penn State to a national championship in 2015.

She was an assistant coach for the United States women's national soccer team at the 2008 Summer Olympics.

She was an assistant coach for the United States women's national soccer team for the 2020 CONCACAF Women's Olympic Qualifying Championship.

Personal life
She married Jason Dambach in January 2016.

College head coaching record

References

External links
Penn State bio

1975 births
Living people
American women's soccer players
American women's soccer coaches
William & Mary Tribe women's soccer players
People from Bordentown, New Jersey
Penn State Nittany Lions women's soccer coaches
Dartmouth Big Green women's soccer coaches
Harvard Crimson women's soccer coaches
Women's association football defenders
Women's association football midfielders